George Chisholm MacKay DFC (17 May 1898 – 4 September 1973) was a Canadian First World War flying ace, officially credited with 18 victories.

References

Notes

Websites

1898 births
1973 deaths
Canadian World War I flying aces
Royal Naval Air Service aviators
Royal Air Force officers
Royal Naval Air Service personnel of World War I
Royal Air Force personnel of World War I
People from Brock, Ontario

Recipients of the Distinguished Flying Cross (United Kingdom)
Recipients of the Legion of Honour